Marc Lazzaro (born 10 November 1955) is a French former freestyle swimmer. He competed at the 1976 Summer Olympics and the 1980 Summer Olympics.

References

External links
 

1955 births
Living people
French male freestyle swimmers
Olympic swimmers of France
Swimmers at the 1976 Summer Olympics
Swimmers at the 1980 Summer Olympics
Place of birth missing (living people)
Mediterranean Games silver medalists for France
Mediterranean Games medalists in swimming
Swimmers at the 1975 Mediterranean Games
20th-century French people
21st-century French people